"Scarborough Fair" is a traditional English ballad. The song lists a number of impossible tasks given to a former lover who lives in Scarborough, North Yorkshire. The "Scarborough/Whittingham Fair" variant was most common in Yorkshire and Northumbria, where it was sung to various melodies, often using Dorian mode, with refrains resembling "parsley, sage, rosemary and thyme" and "Then she'll be a true love of mine." It appears in Traditional Tunes by Frank Kidson published in 1891, who claims to have collected it from Whitby.

The famous melody was collected from Mark Anderson (1874–1953), a retired lead miner from Middleton-in-Teesdale, County Durham, England, by Ewan MacColl in 1947. This version was recorded by a number of musicians in the 20th century, including the version by the 1960s folk rock duo Simon & Garfunkel, who learned it from Martin Carthy.

History
The lyrics of "Scarborough Fair" appear to have something in common with a Scottish ballad titled "The Elfin Knight", collected by Francis James Child as Child Ballad #2, which has been traced as far back as 1670. In this ballad, an elf threatens to abduct a young woman to be his lover unless she can perform an impossible task ("For thou must shape a sark to me / Without any cut or heme, quoth he"); she responds with a list of tasks that he must first perform ("I have an aiker of good ley-land / Which lyeth low by yon sea-strand").

Dozens of versions existed by the end of the 18th century. A number of older versions refer to locations other than Scarborough Fair, including Wittingham Fair, Cape Ann, "twixt Berwik and Lyne", etc. Many versions do not mention a place name and are often generically titled ("The Lovers' Tasks", "My Father Gave Me an Acre of Land", etc.).

The references to the traditional English fair, "Scarborough Fair" and the refrain "parsley, sage, rosemary, and thyme" date to 19th-century versions, and the refrain may have been borrowed from the ballad Riddles Wisely Expounded, (Child Ballad #1), which has a similar plot.

Lyrics
The lyrics, as published by Frank Kidson, begin:

Alternative refrains
The oldest versions of "The Elfin Knight" (circa 1650) contain the refrain "my plaid away, my plaid away, the wind shall not blow my plaid away." Slightly more recent versions often contain one of a group of related refrains:
"Sober and grave grows merry in time"
"Every rose grows merry with time"
"There's never a rose grows fairer with time"
"Yesterday holds memories in time" (original lyrics by Joseph Vargo for the 2012 album Winter's Majesty by Nox Arcana) 
These are usually paired with "Once (s)he was a true love of mine" or some variant. "Parsley, sage, rosemary and thyme" may simply be an alternate rhyming refrain to the original based on a corruption of "grows merry in time" into "rosemary and thyme."

Recordings

Field recordings
Authentic recordings of the ballad include the following examples:
 Georgia Ann Griffin of Newberry, Alachua, Florida. Recorded by John Lomax in 1939.
 Allie Long Parker of Hogscald Hollow, Eureka Springs, Arkansas. Recorded by Mary Parler on 7 April 1958.
 Sara Cleveland of Brant Lake, New York. Recorded by Sandy Paton in 1966.
 Elizabeth "Liz" Jefferies. Recorded in Bristol by Barry and Chris Morgan in 1976.

Commercial recordings
The earliest commercial recording of the ballad was made by actor/singers Gordon Heath and Lee Payant, Americans who ran a café and nightclub, L'Abbaye, on the Rive Gauche in Paris. The recording appeared on the 1955 Elektra album Encores from the Abbaye. The song was also included on the 1956 album The English and Scottish Popular Ballads vol IV by A. L. Lloyd and Ewan MacColl, using Kidson's melody.

The version using the melody later used by Simon & Garfunkel in "Scarborough Fair/Canticle" was first sung by Mark Anderson (1874–1953), a retired lead miner from Middleton-in-Teesdale, County Durham, England to Ewan MacColl in 1947. MacColl recorded the lyrics and melody in a book of Teesdale folk songs, and later included it on his and Peggy Seeger's The Singing Island (1960). An audio recording of Anderson's version was never made, although Alan Lomax recorded Anderson singing other songs in 1951.

The first recorded version using the best-known melody was performed by Audrey Coppard on the 1956 album English Folk Songs. A decade after collecting the song, MacColl released his own version, accompanied by Peggy Seeger on guitar, on the 1957 LP Matching Songs of the British Isles and America and an a capella rendition another decade later on The Long Harvest (1967).

In 1965, Martin Carthy sang "Scarborough Fair" on his eponymous debut album after having picked up the tune from the songbook by MacColl and Seeger.

Marianne Faithfull recorded the song for her album North Country Maid, released in April 1966.

In 1969, Vicky Leandros recorded the song in several versions for release throughout Europe, Canada and Japan, singing in English, German, French ("Chèvrefeuille que tu es loin") and Greek ("Νά Θυμάσαι Πώς Μ' αγαπάς").

Celtic Women recorded a version of the song for their third album Celtic Woman: A New Journey released January 2007.

Nox Arcana recorded a ghost-story version with all original lyrics by Joseph Vargo for the 2012 album Winter's Majesty.

Soundtrack recordings 
Instrumental versions of Scarborough Fair were arranged by Geoff Knorr for use in the video game Civilization VI as the main theme of the English civilization. As the themes of each civilization are played as different variations of the same song as the game progresses, four different variations of the song are included in the game's soundtrack, with Phill Boucher assisting Knorr in the arrangement of the Atomic Era version of the song.

Simon & Garfunkel version

In London in 1965, Paul Simon learned the song from Martin Carthy, who had picked up the song from the songbook by MacColl and Seeger and included it on his eponymous 1965 album. Simon & Garfunkel set it in counterpoint with "Canticle", a reworking of the lyrics from Simon's 1963 anti-war song "The Side of a Hill", set to a new melody composed mainly by Art Garfunkel. "Scarborough Fair/Canticle" appeared as the lead track on the 1966 album Parsley, Sage, Rosemary and Thyme, and was released as a single after it had been featured on the soundtrack to The Graduate in 1968. The copyright credited only Simon and Garfunkel as the authors, which upset Carthy, who felt that the "traditional" source should have been credited. The rift persisted until Simon invited Carthy to perform the song with him as a duet at a London concert in 2000. Simon performed the song with the Muppets when he guest-starred on The Muppet Show.

Before Simon learned the song, Bob Dylan had borrowed the melody and several lines from Carthy's arrangement to create his song "Girl from the North Country", which is featured on The Freewheelin' Bob Dylan (1963), Nashville Skyline (1969) (with Johnny Cash), Real Live (1984) and The 30th Anniversary Concert Celebration (1993).

Chart performance

Cover versions 
In 2020, Dan Avidan collaborated with musical group Super Guitar Bros to record a cover version of the song, including the "Canticle" counterpoint, for the album Dan Avidan & Super Guitar Bros that was released in April of that year.

References

1966 singles
Columbia Records singles
English ballads
English folk songs
List songs
Northumbrian folklore
Scarborough, North Yorkshire
Simon & Garfunkel songs
Song recordings produced by Bob Johnston
Songs about England
Songwriter unknown
Traditional ballads
Year of song unknown